The 1991 CONCACAF Gold Cup was the first edition of the Gold Cup, the soccer championship of North America, Central America and the Caribbean (CONCACAF), and the eleventh overall CONCACAF tournament. The last time the CONCACAF Championship was held was 1971, from that point on the first-place finishers of World Cup qualifying were considered continental champions.

The tournament was hosted by the United States and played in the Greater Los Angeles area of California at two venues: the Los Angeles Memorial Coliseum and the Rose Bowl. The eight teams were broken up into two groups of four; the top two teams of each group would advance to the semifinals. The Gold Cup was won by the United States, who eliminated Mexico in the semi-finals match, and went on to beat Honduras on penalties after tying them in the final 0–0.

Qualified teams

Venues

Squads

The 8 national teams involved in the tournament were required to register a squad of 18 players; only players in these squads were eligible to take part in the tournament.

Group stage

Group A

Group B

Knockout stage

In the knockout stage, if a match is level at the end of normal playing time, extra time is played (two periods of 15 minutes each), with each team being allowed to make a sixth substitution. If still tied after extra time, the match is decided by a penalty shoot-out.

Bracket

Semi-finals

Third place play-off

Final

Statistics

Goalscorers
4 goals
 Benjamín Galindo

3 goals

 Dale Mitchell
 Eduardo Bennett
 Luis Calix
 Carlos Hermosillo

2 goals

 Marco Antonio Anariba
 Eugenio Dolmo Flores
 Roderick Reid
 Leonson Lewis
 Bruce Murray
 Peter Vermes

1 goal

 John Limniatis
 Jamie Lowery
 Colin Miller
 Juan Carlos Arguedas
 Leonidas Flores
 Róger Gómez
 Claudio Jara
 Hernán Medford
 Luis Espel
 Juan Carlos Espinoza
 Gilberto Yearwood
 Hector Wright
 Luís Roberto Alves
 Gonzalo Farfán
 José Manuel de la Torre
 Alvin Thomas
 Marcelo Balboa
 John Doyle
 Hugo Pérez
 Brian Quinn
 Eric Wynalda

1 own goal
 Héctor Marchena (playing against the United States)

Awards

Winners

References

External links
Lineups/Squads

 
1991
Gold Cup
CONCACAF Gold Cup 1991